Letter Hill is a large hill near the coast to the north-west of Letterfrack in County Galway, Ireland.

Geography 
The summit hosts a small cairn and offers a panoramic view of the Twelve Bens, the north Connemara and Mayo coastlines, Inishbofin and other islands. Tully Mountain, as well as  Tully Lough, takes its name from Tully village, located on the north-eastern side of the mountain. The walk which leads to the summit does not require any special hiking ability.

Ecology
The mountain is composed of Dalradian schists and gneisses. The main features are rocky outcrops and upland grassland, with alpine and subalpine heaths. The lower slopes have been overgrazed by sheep and there are dense patches of bracken. The dry heath above  supports juniper and bearberry with heather, bell heather, St. Dabeoc’s Heath and cross-leaved heath, and lichens and mosses, an unusual combination in the west of Ireland. There are some flattish wet grassland with soft rush, bog mosses (Sphagnum) and plants such as bladderwort, and some wet flushes, with sedges, bog mosses, bog pimpernel and sundews.

Archaeology 
The area around Tully Mountain is rich in pre-historic remains like a court tomb and a stone alignment between the mountain itself and Tully Lough.

Conservation 
Tully Lough and the NE slopes of the mountain have been designated as a candidate Special Area of Conservation under the EU Habitats Directive. Tully Mountain has been listed as a Special Area of Conservation.

See also 
 List of Marilyns in Ireland

References

External links 
Tully Mountain walk

Mountains and hills of County Galway
Marilyns of Ireland